Doris Benta Maria Löve, née Wahlén (born 2 January 1918 in Kristianstad – deceased 25 February 2000 in San Jose, California) was a Swedish systematic botanist, particularly active in the Arctic.

Biography 
Doris Löve was born in Kristianstad, Sweden. She studied botany at Lund University from 1937. She married her fellow student and colleague, the Icelander Áskell Löve. She received her PhD in botany in 1944. She focused her doctorate on the sexuality of Melandrium. After their studies, the couple moved to Iceland. They moved to Winnipeg in 1951, to Montreal in 1955, and to Boulder in 1965. At universities where Áskell Löve taught, Doris Löve could not hold a faculty position at the same time as her husband. They finally moved to San Jose, California, in 1974.

Together, Áskell and Doris Löve undertook numerous investigations of the chromosome numbers of plants and their use in plant systematics. They published numerous accounts in this field, and are considered the founders of cytotaxonomy.

In 1962, she was the convener of an influential scientific conference on the North Atlantic Biota and their History with contributions from a.o. Eric Hultén, Tyge W. Böcher, Hugo Sjörs, John Axel Nannfeldt, Knut Fægri, Bruce C. Heezen and Marie Tharp.

In 1974, her husband Áskell Löve, then full professor and chairman of the biology department of the university of Colorado Boulder, was forced to resign. In 1997, she wrote her family history, a 86-page biography that provides a detailed explanation of her husband's forced resignation. This mémoire was deposited at the Hunt Botanical Library in Pittsburgh in 1997 and was supposed to be kept unreleased until 2018.

Other roles 

 Member of the Institute of Arctic and Alpine Research (IAAR)
 Associate curator of University of Colorado Museum Herbarium (COLO)

Selected publications

Papers on botany

Conference proceedings
 This conference dealt with biogeographical effects of the continental drift.

Her classification work enabled Kenneth Hare's wife Jocelyn to put together an herbarium of plants from the Kaumajet Mountains.

Translations 

 Botanical observations of the Penny Highlands of Baffin Island, Results of the Second Baffin Expedition by the Arctic Institute of North America (1953) under the leadership of Col. P.D. Baird 
 Nikolai Vavilov, Origin and geography of cultivated plants, Archives of Natural History, January 1994

Doris Löve also translated two books of Nikolai Vavilov in English.

Footnotes

1918 births
2000 deaths
20th-century Swedish botanists
Swedish women botanists
Botanists active in the Arctic
Lund University alumni
Academic staff of the University of Iceland
Academic staff of the University of Manitoba
Academic staff of the Université de Montréal
20th-century Swedish women scientists
Swedish expatriates in the United States
Swedish expatriates in Canada
Swedish expatriates in Iceland